Tennis player Alejandro Falla was the 2012 Open Seguros Bolívar defending champion.

He lost in the 2013 semifinals  to Thomaz Bellucci. The eventual champion was Víctor Estrella Burgos.

Seeds

Draw

Finals

Top half

Bottom half

References
 Main Draw
 Qualifying Draw

Open Seguros Bolivar - Singles
2013 S